The European Academy of Occupational Health Psychology (EA-OHP) is a pan-European organization that was established in 1999. It is the first organization of its kind in the world that is devoted to occupational health psychology. In order to obtain membership in the EA-OHP, "applicants should possess i) a degree in psychology or closely related subject and ii) at least three years active involvement in occupational health psychology."

The activities of the EA-OHP are centered on research, practice, and education. The Academy organizes a major international conference on OHP every two years. The EA-OHP is also associated with the journal Work & Stress. The Academy publishes a newsletter, The Occupational Health Psychologist, three times per year to keep the membership abreast of developments in the field.  The EA-OHP runs regional workshops to benefit its members and other professionals. The EA-OHP also runs a listserv that promotes communication about research, practice, and teaching bearing on work, stress, and health. Beginning with an agreement in 2008, the Academy coordinates member benefits and international conferences with the Society for Occupational Health Psychology (SOHP), a U.S. organization.

Historical development

In 1997 representatives from the University of Nottingham and the departments of Occupational Medicine at two Danish hospitals, Skive Syghus and Herning Syghus, wrote an enabling document that laid the foundation for an organizing committee, the purpose of which was to create a European organization dedicated to supporting “research, teaching and practice” in OHP. The EA-OHP came into existence in 1999. The organization operated out of the Institute of Work, Health & Organisations, at the University of Nottingham, under Tom Cox's leadership and "actively supported by a pan-European team of individuals and institutions." The organization developed working groups in research, teaching, and practice.

The EA-OHP’s leading activity was organizing annual conferences that facilitated the sharing of research findings and educational and practice information. Attendance at the Academy’s conferences increased steadily. By 2006, the EA-OHP conference series became biennial. By way of an agreement reached in 2008 with their U.S. counterparts in the Society for Occupational Health Psychology (SOHP), the EA-OHP now coordinates its conference series with the APA/NIOSH/SOHP Work, Stress, and Health conference series. The first EA-OHP conference was attended mainly by academics, but the conference series increasingly attracted practitioners and graduate students as well as occupational safety and health practitioners. In 2000, the journal Work & Stress, which was founded in 1987 by Tom Cox, became associated with the Academy. Other publishing activities include the publication of conference proceedings and a book series. A more detailed history of the EA-OHP was published in 2009.

See also
 Industrial and organizational psychology
 Journal of Occupational Health Psychology
 Occupational Health Science
 Society for Occupational Health Psychology

References

External links
 
 Society for Occupational Health Psychology

Occupational health psychology
Psychology organisations based in the United Kingdom
Organizations established in 1999
English-language journals
Organisations based in Nottingham
International organizations based in Europe
University of Nottingham